Moshe Gafni (born 5 May 1952) is an Israeli politician, Member of the Knesset, and leader of the Ashkenazi Haredi party United Torah Judaism.

Early life
Born in Tel Aviv, Gafni was educated in a yeshiva, and later moved to and worked as head of a Kollel in Ofakim. He lives in Bnei Brak, is married, and has three children.

Political career
He was first elected to the Knesset on Degel HaTorah's list in 1988, and was appointed Deputy Minister of Religious Affairs in Yitzhak Shamir's government in 1990. For the 1992 elections, the party joined Agudat Yisrael in forming an alliance called United Torah Judaism, which won four seats. Although he initially lost his seat, Gafni entered the Knesset in 1994 as part of a rotation agreement between the two factions. A similar arrangement operated after the 1996 elections, with Gafni taking the seat for the first half of the session (i. e., until 1998).

Early elections in 1999 meant that Gafni re-appeared in the Knesset sooner than expected. This time, no rotation agreement was in place, so he served his full term, and was re-elected in both 2003 and 2006. When Degel HaTorah split from Agudat Yisrael during the latter stages of the 16th Knesset, Gafni was appointed the party's Parliamentary Group Chairman.

In the 18th Knesset, Gafni was the chairman of the Knesset's financial committee.

Views and opinions
Gafni was strongly opposed to the Supreme Court ruling that the state must recognize gay marriages carried out abroad, stating: "We don't have a Jewish state here. We have Sodom and Gomorrah here." However, he was one of the few ultra-Orthodox public figures to condemn the violence carried out by members of the community over plans for the 2006 Jerusalem gay pride parade.

In February 2016, Israeli Prime Minister Benjamin Netanyahu criticized Gafni and other government leaders for making disparaging remarks about Reform and Conservative Judaism. Gafni, following a decision to expand the egalitarian section of the Western Wall, declared he would refuse to recognize the decision, and that Reform Jews were "a group of clowns who stab the Holy Torah".

References

External links

1952 births
Living people
Degel HaTorah politicians
Deputy ministers of Israel
Haredi rabbis in Israel
Israeli Ashkenazi Jews
Israeli people of Polish-Jewish descent
Jewish Israeli politicians
Members of the 12th Knesset (1988–1992)
Members of the 13th Knesset (1992–1996)
Members of the 14th Knesset (1996–1999)
Members of the 15th Knesset (1999–2003)
Members of the 16th Knesset (2003–2006)
Members of the 17th Knesset (2006–2009)
Members of the 18th Knesset (2009–2013)
Members of the 19th Knesset (2013–2015)
Members of the 20th Knesset (2015–2019)
Members of the 21st Knesset (2019)
Members of the 22nd Knesset (2019–2020)
Members of the 23rd Knesset (2020–2021)
Members of the 24th Knesset (2021–2022)
Members of the 25th Knesset (2022–)
Politicians from Tel Aviv
Rabbinic members of the Knesset
Rabbis in Bnei Brak
United Torah Judaism leaders